Anatole Kanyenkiko (born 1952) was the Prime Minister of Burundi from 7 February 1994 to 22 February 1995. An ethnic Tutsi from Ngozi Province, Kanyenkiko was a member of the Union for National Progress (UPRONA), a political party.

On 14 November 2007 President Pierre Nkurunziza appointed him Minister of Environment, Land Development and Public Works.

References

1952 births
Living people
Prime Ministers of Burundi
Union for National Progress politicians
Tutsi people
People from Ngozi Province